"Can't Keep Waiting" is a song recorded by Canadian country music duo Autumn Hill for their debut studio album, Favourite Mistake (2013). The song was written by group members Mike Robins and Tareya Green along with Jamie Appleby and Alyssa Reid, while production was handled by Dave "Dwave" Thomson and Thomas "Tawgs" Salter. It was released through Wax Records as the second single from the album on April 9, 2013.

Alyssa Reid recorded an acoustic cover of the song for her third studio album, Phoenix (2015).

Content
The song's lyrics depict a narrator who has grown frustrated with hoping somebody will feel a certain way about them and insists they "can't keep waiting" for it to happen.

Music video
The accompanying music video was directed by Marc André Debruyne and premiered April 29, 2013.

Chart performance

References

2013 singles
Country ballads
Autumn Hill songs
2013 songs
Songs written by Alyssa Reid
Songs written by James Ash